Jannisar Khan (born 6 October 1981) is an American Pakistani cricketer who played first-class matches for Peshawar. In August 2018, he was named in the United States' squad for the 2018–19 ICC World Twenty20 Americas Qualifier tournament in Morrisville, North Carolina.

In October 2018, he was named in the United States' squads for the 2018–19 Regional Super50 tournament in the West Indies and for the 2018 ICC World Cricket League Division Three tournament in Oman. Following the conclusion of the Division Three tournament, he was given a two-match ban for breaching the ICC Code of Conduct in the match against Singapore. In February 2019, he was named in the United States' Twenty20 International (T20I) squad for their series against the United Arab Emirates. The matches were the first T20I fixtures to be played by the United States cricket team. Khan was named in the squad to allow him to serve out his two-match ban, so he would be available to play for the United States in the 2019 ICC World Cricket League Division Two tournament. In April 2019, he was named in the United States cricket team's squad for the Division Two tournament in Namibia.

In June 2021, he was selected to take part in the Minor League Cricket tournament in the United States following the players' draft.

References

External links
 

1981 births
Living people
American cricketers
Pakistani cricketers
Peshawar cricketers
Redco Pakistan Limited cricketers
Cricketers from Peshawar
Pakistani emigrants to the United States